The British Academy Television Craft Awards of 2010 are presented by the British Academy of Film and Television Arts (BAFTA) and were held on 23 May 2010 at Hilton Hotel, Mayfair, the ceremony was hosted by Christine Bleakley.

Winners and nominees
Winners will be listed first and highlighted in boldface.

{| class="wikitable"
|-
! style="background:#BDB76B; width:50%" |  Best Director - Fiction/Entertainment
! style="background:#BDB76B; width:50%" |  Best Director - Factual
|-
| valign="top" |
 Philip Martin – Mo
 Yann Demange – Criminal Justice
 James Hawes – Enid
 Aisling Walsh – Wallander (Episode: "The Fifth Woman") 
| valign="top" |
 Patrick Forbes – The Force
 Annabel Gillings – How Earth Made Us (Episode: "Water")
 Nick Read – Dispatches (Episode: "The Slumdog Children of Mumbai") 
 Dan Reed – Dispatches (Episode: "Terror in Mumbai") 
|-
|-
! style="background:#BDB76B; width:50%" |  Best Writer
! style="background:#BDB76B; width:50%" |  Best Breakthrough Talent 
|-
| valign="top" |
 Guy Hibbert – Five Minutes of Heaven
 Peter Bowker – Occupation
 Writing Team – The Thick of It
 Heidi Thomas – Cranford
| valign="top" |
 Jessie Versluys – The Hospital/Katie: My Beautiful Face
 Ed Hime – Skins
 Matt Rudge – The Autistic Me
 Ed Wardle – Alone in the Wild
|-
|-
! style="background:#BDB76B; width:50%" |  Best Original Television Music
! style="background:#BDB76B; width:50%" |  Best Make-Up and Hair Design
|-
| valign="top" |
 Small Island – Martin Phipps Red Riding 1974 – Adrian Johnston
 Moses Jones – Craig Pruess
 Being Human – Richard Wells
| valign="top" |
 Mo – Christina Baker The Impressions Show with Culshaw and Stephenson – Lucy Cain
 Enid – Lisa Cavelli-Green
 Red Riding 1974 – Jacqueline Fowler
|-
|-
! style="background:#BDB76B; width:50%" |  Best Costume Design
! style="background:#BDB76B; width:50%" |  Best Production Design
|-
| valign="top" |
 Red Riding 1974 – Natalie Ward An Englishman in New York – Joey Attawia
 Cranford – Jenny Beavan
 Desperate Romantics – James Keast
| valign="top" |
 Gracie! – Claire Kenny Wallander – Jacqueline Abrahams
 Red Riding 1974 – Christina Casali
 An Englishman in New York – Beth Mickle
|-
|-
! style="background:#BDB76B; width:50%" |  Best Photography and Lighting - Fiction/Entertainment
! style="background:#BDB76B; width:50%" |  Best Photography - Factual
|-
| valign="top" |
 Red Riding 1974 – David Higgs Desperate Romantics – Alan Almond
 Small Island – Tony Miller
 Hamlet – Chris Seager
 Garrow's Law – Lukas Strebel
 Wallander – Lukas Strebel
| valign="top" |
 Yellowstone (Episode: "Winter") – Camera Team How Earth Made Us – Camera Team
 Life (Episode: "Insects") – Rod Clarke, Kevin Flay
 Andrew Marr's The Making of Modern Britain – Neil Harvey
 Dispatches (Episode: "The Slumdog Children of Mumbai") – Nick Read
|-
|-
! style="background:#BDB76B; width:50%" |  Best Editing - Fiction/Entertainment
! style="background:#BDB76B; width:50%" |  Best Editing - Factual
|-
| valign="top" |
 Mo – Kristina Hetherington Occupation – Victoria Boydell
 Red Riding 1974 – Andrew Hulme
 A Short Stay in Switzerland – Adam Recht
 Criminal Justice – Chris Wyatt
| valign="top" |
 The Secret Life of The Berlin Wall – Gregor Lyon Life (Episode: "Birds") – Jo Payne
 Dispatches (Episode: "The Slumdog Children of Mumbai") – Jay Taylor
 Top Gear – Team
|-
|-
! style="background:#BDB76B; width:50%" |  Best Sound - Fiction/Entertainment
! style="background:#BDB76B; width:50%" |  Best Sound - Factual
|-
| valign="top" |
 Wallander – Paul Hamblin, Andre Schmidt, Catherine Hodgson, Bosse Persson Red Riding 1974 – Paul Cotterell, Danny Hambrook, Kallis Shamaris
 Cranford – Paul Hamblin, Peter Brill, Iain Eyre, Lee Walpole
 Spooks – Nigel Heath, Darren Banks, Laura Lovejoy, Rudi Buckle
| valign="top" |
 Trawlermen – George Foulgham, Lisa Marie McStay, Kiff McManus, Dafydd Baines 9/11: Phone Calls from The Towers – Ben Baird, Adam Wilks, Ben Lester, Merce Williams
 Nature's Great Events (Episode: "The Great Feast") – Paul Cowgill, Kate Hopkins, Andrew Wilson, Graham Wild
 Life (Episode: "Insects") – Chris Domaille, Graham Wild, Tim Owens, Kate Hopkins
|-
|-
! style="background:#BDB76B; width:50%" |  Best Visual Effects
! style="background:#BDB76B; width:50%" |  Best Titles
|-
| valign="top" |
 The Day of the Triffids – Tom Turnbull, Joel Collins, Rene Morel World War II in Colour – Alan Griffiths, Matthew Barrett, Vivek Rao
 Merlin – The Mill
 Doctor Who – The Mill
| valign="top" |
 BBC Winter Olympics – Marc Craste, Damon Collins, Tim McNaughton, Freddy Mandy Misfits – Miki Kato, Nic Benns
 Formula 1 – Liquid TV
 Cast Offs – Victor Martinez, Joel Wilson
|-
|-
! style="background:#BDB76B; width:50%" |  Best Entertainment Production Team
! style="background:#BDB76B; width:50%" |  BBC Blast and BAFTA Screen-Skills Award
|-
| valign="top" |
 The X Factor
 The Apprentice
 Britain's Got Talent
 Top Gear
| valign="top" |
 Sam Shetabi
 Harriet Beaney
 Jack Crocker
 Joe Reed
|-
|-
! style="background:#BDB76B; width:50%" |  Best Interactive Creative Contribution
|-
| valign="top" |
 Embarrassing Bodies/Embarrassing Bodies Live – Production Team Who Killed Summer? – Bigballs Films, MWorks, Hideous Productions
 The Apprentice: Predictor – Robert Marsh, Oliver Davies, Simon Brickle
 Science of Scams – Anthony Owen, Anthony Waldron, Vanessa Arden-Wood
|-
|-
|}

Special awards
 Coronation Street

See also
 2010 British Academy Television Awards

References

External links
British Academy Craft Awards official website

2010 television awards
2010 in British television
2010 in London
May 2010 events in the United Kingdom
2010